The Women's 52 kg powerlifting event at the 2004 Summer Paralympics was competed  on 21 September. It was won by Tamara Podpalnaya, representing .

Final round

21 Sept. 2004, 13:45

References

W
Para